.cv is the country code top-level domain (ccTLD) for Cape Verde. It is managed by the National Communications Agency (ANAC). It was introduced on 21 October 1996 and initially it was managed by the Instituto Superior de Engenharia e Ciências do Mar (ISECMAR), later the School of Maritime Sciences, and finally a campus of the University of Cape Verde, until its redelegation in August 2009 by the current National Communications Agency.

The technical manager, originally the Foundation for the National Scientific Information of Portugal (FCCN), a non-profit organisation who managed the .pt domain name, transferred the rights and obligations managing the top level domains to DNS.PT in 2014. The transfer of management rights by the IANA was published for .cv in June of that year.

ANAC is part of the group LusNIC, an entity which includes top-level domains of other countries including .br (Brazil), .gw (Guinea-Bissau), .pt (Portugal), .st (São Tomé and Príncipe) and .ao (Angola). This is why the .cv domain shares a part of the .pt network infrastructure (notably for a part of its DNS servers), and its technical management is delegated to the DNS.PT association.

ANAC has defined the following second-level domains, each with specific target users:
 .net.cv:  communication and network services
 .gov.cv:  governmental institutions
 .org.cv:  nonprofit organizations
 .edu.cv:  schools and universities (both public and private)
 .int.cv:  international organizations and diplomatic missions
 .publ.cv: periodical magazines registered with the Directorate General of Social Communication
 .com.cv:  not restricted, intended for commercial entities
 .nome.cv: Cape Verde nationals and legal residents.

As of October 2017, 1,743 websites use the domain .cv, of which 1,377 use the domain .cv alone, 252 use .com.cv, 69 use .org.cv, 38 use .edu.cv including all university sites such as UniCV, six use .publ.cv and one use .net.cv. The number using .gov.cv is unknown, as that subdomain is not maintained by ANAC but by the Government of Cape Verde.

References

External links 
 IANA .cv whois information

Country code top-level domains
Communications in Cape Verde

sv:Toppdomän#C